Michael Johnston (born 16 February 1971) is a former Australian rules footballer who played with Hawthorn and Footscray in the Australian Football League (AFL).

A Leongatha recruit, Johnston appeared only sporadically for Hawthorn, his biggest run in the team coming late in the 1992 season when he made four appearances.  His best game was his AFL debut, against the Brisbane Bears at Princes Park, where he kicked two goals and had 20 disposals.

Johnston went to Footscray via the 1995 Pre-Season Draft and played two senior games for his new club in 1995.

References

1971 births
Australian rules footballers from Victoria (Australia)
Hawthorn Football Club players
Western Bulldogs players
Leongatha Football Club players
Living people